NK Železničar may refer to:

NK Železničar Ljubljana – former name of NK Ljubljana
NK Železničar Maribor
NK Železničar Nova Gorica – former name of ND Gorica

See also
NK Željezničar (disambiguation)
FK Železničar (disambiguation)
FK Željezničar (disambiguation)